Jamieson is an unincorporated community in Malheur County, Oregon, United States. Jamieson's only business or service is a post office with ZIP code 97909. There are less than a half-dozen homes, mostly trailer homes.

References

Unincorporated communities in Malheur County, Oregon
Unincorporated communities in Oregon